
Threatened sharks are those vulnerable to endangerment (extinction) in the near future. The International Union for Conservation of Nature (IUCN) is the world's oldest global environmental organization. It evaluates threatened species, and treats threatened species not as a single category, but as a group of three categories, depending on the degree to which they are threatened:

 Vulnerable species
 Endangered species
 Critically endangered species

The term threatened strictly refers to these three categories (critically endangered, endangered and vulnerable), while vulnerable is used to refer to the least at risk of these categories. The terms can be used somewhat interchangeably, as all vulnerable species are threatened, all endangered species are vulnerable and threatened, and all critically endangered species are endangered, vulnerable and threatened. Threatened species are also referred to as a red-listed species, as they are listed in the IUCN Red List of Threatened Species.

Shark species are increasingly becoming threatened because of commercial and recreational fishing pressures, the impact of non-shark fisheries on the seabed and shark prey species, and other habitat alterations such as damage and loss from coastal development and marine pollution. Rising demands for shark products has increased pressure on shark fisheries, but little monitoring or management occurs of most fisheries. Major declines in shark stocks have been recorded over the past few decades; some species had declined over 90% and population declines of 70% were not unusual by 1998. In particular, harvesting young sharks before they reproduce severely impacts future populations. Sharks generally reach sexual maturity only after many years and produce few offspring in comparison to other fish species.

Conservationists estimate that up to 100 million sharks are killed by commercial and recreational fishing every year. Sharks are often killed for shark fin soup, which some Asian countries regard as a status symbol. Fishermen capture live sharks, fin them, and dump the finless animal back into the water to die from suffocation or predators. Sharks are also killed for their flesh in Europe and elsewhere.  The 2007 film Sharkwater documents ways in which sharks are being hunted to extinction. In 2009, the IUCN Shark Specialist Group reported on the conservation status of pelagic (open water) sharks and rays. They found that over half the pelagic sharks targeted by high-seas fisheries were threatened with extinction.

In 2010, the Convention on International Trade in Endangered Species (CITES) rejected proposals from the United States and Palau that would have required countries to strictly regulate trade in several species of hammerhead, oceanic whitetip and dogfish sharks. The majority, but not the required two-thirds of voting delegates, approved the proposal. China, by far the world's largest shark consumer, and Japan, which battles all attempts to extend the convention's protections to marine species, led the opposition.

In 2013, CITES member nations overcame the continued opposition led by China and Japan, and reversed course. In what CITES has called a "milestone", the oceanic whitetip, porbeagle, and three species of hammerheads will now join the great white, basking and whale shark on CITES Appendix II, effective September 2014.  International trade of these species is thus prohibited without CITES permits, "... and evidence will have to be provided that they are harvested sustainably and legally."

In 2014 the state government of Western Australia led by Premier Colin Barnett implemented a policy of killing large sharks. The policy is intended to protect users of the marine environment from shark attack following the deaths of seven people on the Western Australian coastline in the years 2010 to 2013. Baited drum lines are deployed near popular beaches using hooks designed to catch the vulnerable great white shark, as well as bull and tiger sharks. Large sharks found hooked but still alive are shot and their bodies discarded at sea. The government claims they are not culling sharks, but are using a "targeted, localised, hazard mitigation strategy". Barnett has described opposition to killing the sharks as "ludicrous" and "extreme", and said that nothing can change his mind.

According to a 2021 study published in the journal Nature, relative fishing pressure in the oceans has increased by a factor of 18 since 1970. This overfishing has resulted in the number of oceanic sharks and rays declining globally by 71%, and has increased the global extinction risk to the point where three-quarters of these species are now threatened with extinction. Precautionary science-based catch limits and strict prohibitions are now needed urgently if population collapse is to be avoided, if the disruption of ecological functions is to be averted, and if a start is to be made on rebuilding global fisheries.

List
{| class="sortable wikitable"
|-
! Order
! Image
! Scientific name
! Common name 
! Population trend
! IUCN status
! FishBase
! FAO
! CITESAppendix
|-
! style="background:rgb(110,110,170)" | Mackerelshark
| 
| Alopias pelagicus
| Pelagic thresher
| align=center |decreasing
|  Endangered
| align="center" | 
| align="center" | 
| 
|-
! style="background:rgb(110,110,170)" | Mackerelshark
| 
| Alopias superciliosus
| Bigeye thresher shark
| align=center |decreasing
|  Vulnerable
| align="center" | 
| align="center" | 
| 
|-
! style="background:rgb(110,110,170)" | Mackerelshark
| 
| Alopias vulpinus
| Common thresher
| align=center |decreasing
|  Vulnerable
| align="center" | 
| align="center" | 
| 
|-
! style="background:rgb(110,110,170)" | Groundshark
| 
| Atelomycterus baliensis
| Bali catshark
| align=center |unknown
|  Vulnerable
| align="center" | 
| 
| 
|-
! style="background:rgb(110,110,170)" | Groundshark
| 
| Aulohalaelurus kanakorum
| New Caledonia catshark
| align=center |unknown
|  Vulnerable
| align="center" | 
| 
| 
|-
! style="background:rgb(110,110,170)" | Carpet shark
| 
| Brachaelurus colcloughi
| Bluegrey carpetshark
| align=center |unknown
|  Vulnerable
| align="center" | 
| 
| 
|-
! style="background:rgb(110,110,170)" | Groundshark
| 
| Carcharhinus borneensis
| Borneo shark
| align=center |unknown
|  Critically Endangered
| align="center" | 
| 
| 
|-
! style="background:rgb(110,110,170)" | Groundshark
| 
| Carcharhinus hemiodon
| Pondicherry shark
| align=center |unknown
|  Critically endangered
| align="center" | 
| 
| 
|-
! style="background:rgb(110,110,170)" | Groundshark
| 
| Carcharhinus leiodon
| Smoothtooth blacktip shark
| align=center |unknown
|  Vulnerable
| align="center" | 
| 
| 
|-
! style="background:rgb(110,110,170)" | Groundshark
| 
| Carcharhinus longimanus
| Oceanic whitetip shark
| align=center |decreasing
|  Critically endangered 
| align="center" | 
| 
| align="center" | II (eff. Sep-2014)
|-
! style="background:rgb(110,110,170)" | Groundshark
| 
| Carcharhinus obscurus
| Dusky shark
| align=center |decreasing
|  Vulnerable
| align="center" | 
| align="center" | 
| 
|-
! style="background:rgb(110,110,170)" | Groundshark
| 
| Carcharhinus plumbeus
| Sandbar shark
| align=center |decreasing
|  Vulnerable
| align="center" | 
| align="center" | 
| 
|-
! style="background:rgb(110,110,170)" | Groundshark
| 
| Carcharhinus signatus
| Night shark
| align=center |unknown
|  Vulnerable
| align="center" | 
| align="center" | 
| 
|-
! style="background:rgb(110,110,170)" | Mackerelshark
| 
| Carcharias taurus
| Sand tiger
| align=center |decreasing
|  Critically endangered
| align="center" | 
| align="center" |  
| 
|-
! style="background:rgb(110,110,170)" | Mackerelshark
| 
| Carcharodon carcharias
| Great white shark
| align=center |unknown
|  Vulnerable
| align="center" | 
| align="center" | 
| align="center" | II
|-
! style="background:rgb(110,110,170)" | Dogfish
| 
| Centrophorus granulosus
| Gulper shark
| align=center |decreasing
|  Vulnerable
| align="center" | 
| align="center" | 
| 
|-
! style="background:rgb(110,110,170)" | Dogfish
| 
| Centrophorus harrissoni
| Dumb gulper shark
| align=center |decreasing
|  Endangered
| align="center" | 
| align="center" | 
| 
|-
! style="background:rgb(110,110,170)" | Dogfish
| 
| Centrophorus lusitanicus
| Lowfin gulper shark
| align=center |unknown
|  Vulnerable
| align="center" | 
| align="center" | 
| 
|-
! style="background:rgb(110,110,170)" | Dogfish
| 
| Centrophorus squamosus
| Deepwater spiny dogfish
| align=center |decreasing
|  Vulnerable
| align="center" | 
| align="center" | 
| 
|-
! style="background:rgb(110,110,170)" | Mackerelshark
| 
| Cetorhinus maximus
| Basking shark
| align=center |decreasing
|  Endangered
| align="center" | 
| align="center" | 
| align="center" | II
|-
! style="background:rgb(110,110,170)" | Groundshark
| 
| Chaenogaleus macrostoma
| Hooktooth shark
| align=center |unknown
|  Vulnerable
| align="center" | 
| 
| 
|-
! style="background:rgb(110,110,170)" | Groundshark
| 
| Galeorhinus galeus
| School shark
| align=center |decreasing
|  Vulnerable
| align="center" | 
| align="center" | 
| 
|-
! style="background:rgb(110,110,170)" | Groundshark
| 
| Galeus mincaronei
| Southern sawtail catshark
| align=center |decreasing
|  Vulnerable
| align="center" | 
| 
| 
|-
! style="background:rgb(110,110,170)" | Groundshark
| 
| Glyphis gangeticus
| Ganges shark
| align=center |decreasing
|  Critically endangered 
| align="center" | 
| 
| 
|-
! style="background:rgb(110,110,170)" | Groundshark
| 
| Glyphis garricki
| New Guinea river shark
| align=center |decreasing
|  Critically endangered 
| align="center" | 
| 
| 
|-
! style="background:rgb(110,110,170)" | Groundshark
| 
| Glyphis glyphis
| Speartooth shark
| align=center |decreasing
|  Endangered
| align="center" | 
| 
| 
|-
! style="background:rgb(110,110,170)" | Groundshark
| 
| Glyphis siamensis
| Irrawaddy river shark
| align=center |unknown
|  Critically endangered 
| align="center" | 
| 
| 
|-
! style="background:rgb(110,110,170)" | Groundshark
| 
| Haploblepharus fuscus
| Brown shyshark
| align=center |unknown
|  Vulnerable
| align="center" | 
| 
| 
|-
! style="background:rgb(110,110,170)" | Groundshark
| 
| Haploblepharus kistnasamyi
| Natal shyshark
| align=center |unknown
|  Critically endangered
| align="center" | 
| 
| 
|-
! style="background:rgb(110,110,170)" | Groundshark
| 
| Hemigaleus microstoma
| Sickle fin weasel shark
| align=center |decreasing
|  Vulnerable
| align="center" | 
| 
| 
|-
! style="background:rgb(110,110,170)" | Groundshark
| 
| Hemipristis elongata
| Snaggletooth shark
| align=center |decreasing
|  Vulnerable
| align="center" | 
| 
| 
|-
! style="background:rgb(110,110,170)" | Carpet shark
| 
| Hemiscyllium hallstromi
| Papuan epaulette shark
| align=center |unknown
|  Vulnerable
| align="center" | 
| align="center" | 
| 
|-
! style="background:rgb(110,110,170)" | Carpet shark
| 
| Hemiscyllium strahani
| Hooded carpet shark
| align=center |unknown
|  Vulnerable
| align="center" | 
| align="center" | 
| 
|-
! style="background:rgb(110,110,170)" | Groundshark
| 
| Hemitriakis leucoperiptera
| Whitefin topeshark
| align=center |unknown
|  Endangered
| align="center" | 
| 
| 
|-
! style="background:rgb(110,110,170)" | Groundshark
| 
| Holohalaelurus favus
| Honeycomb Izak
| align=center |decreasing
|  Endangered
| align="center" | 
| 
| 
|-
! style="background:rgb(110,110,170)" | Groundshark
| 
| Holohalaelurus punctatus
| Whitespotted Izak
| align=center |decreasing
|  Endangered
| align="center" | 
| 
| 
|-
! style="background:rgb(110,110,170)" | Groundshark
| 
| Isogomphodon oxyrhynchus
| Daggernose shark
| align=center |decreasing
|  Critically endangered
| align="center" | 
| 
| 
|-
! style="background:rgb(110,110,170)" | Mackerelshark
| 
| Isurus oxyrinchus
| Shortfin mako
| align=center |decreasing
|  Endangered
| align="center" | 
| align="center" | <ref>[http://www.fao.org/fishery/species/2011/en Isurus oxyrinchus (Rafinesque, 1809)] FAO, Species Fact Sheet. Retrieved April 2013.</ref>
| 
|-
! style="background:rgb(110,110,170)" | Mackerelshark
| 
| Isurus paucus| Longfin mako
| align=center |decreasing
|  Endangered
| align="center" | 
| align="center" | 
| 
|-
! style="background:rgb(110,110,170)" | Groundshark
| 
| Lamiopsis temminckii| Broadfin shark
| align=center |decreasing
|  Endangered
| align="center" | 
| 
| 
|-
! style="background:rgb(110,110,170)" | Mackerelshark
| 
| Lamna nasus| Porbeagle
| align=center |decreasing
|  Vulnerable
| align="center" | 
| 
| align="center" | III(II eff. Sept. 2014)
|-
! style="background:rgb(110,110,170)" | Groundshark
| 
| Mustelus fasciatus| Striped smooth-hound
| align=center |decreasing
|  Critically endangered
| align="center" | 
| 
| 
|-
! style="background:rgb(110,110,170)" | Groundshark
| 
| Mustelus mustelus| Common smoothhound
| align=center |decreasing
|  Vulnerable
| align="center" | 
| 
| 
|-
! style="background:rgb(110,110,170)" | Groundshark
| 
| Mustelus schmitti| Narrownose smoothhound
| align=center |decreasing
|  Endangered
| align="center" | 
| align="center" | 
| 
|-
! style="background:rgb(110,110,170)" | Groundshark
| 
| Mustelus whitneyi| Humpback smoothhound
| align=center |decreasing
|  Vulnerable
| align="center" | 
| 
| 
|-
! style="background:rgb(110,110,170)" | Carpet shark
| 
| Nebrius ferrugineus| Tawny nurse shark
| align=center |decreasing
|  Vulnerable
| align="center" | 
| align="center" | 
| 
|-
! style="background:rgb(110,110,170)" | Groundshark
| 
| Negaprion acutidens| Sharptooth lemon shark
| align=center |decreasing
|  Vulnerable
| align="center" | 
| 
| 
|-
! style="background:rgb(110,110,170)" | Mackerelshark
| 
| Odontaspis ferox| Small-tooth sand tiger shark
| align=center |decreasing
|  Vulnerable
| align="center" | 
| align="center" | 
| 
|-
! style="background:rgb(110,110,170)" | Dogfish
| 
| Oxynotus centrina| Angular rough shark
| align=center |unknown
|  Vulnerable
| align="center" | 
| align="center" | 
| 
|-
! style="background:rgb(110,110,170)" | Carpet shark
| 
| Pseudoginglymostomabrevicaudatum| Shorttail nurse shark
| align=center |unknown
|  Vulnerable
| align="center" | 
| 
| 
|-
! style="background:rgb(110,110,170)" | Carpet shark
| 
| Rhincodon typus| Whale shark
| align=center |decreasing
|  Endangered
| align="center" | 
| align="center" | 
| align="center" | II
|-
! style="background:rgb(110,110,170)" | Groundshark
| 
| Schroederichthyssaurisqualus| Lizard catshark
| align=center |unknown
|  Vulnerable
| align="center" | 
| 
| 
|-
! style="background:rgb(110,110,170)" | Groundshark
| 
| Scylliogaleus quecketti| Flapnose houndshark
| align=center |unknown
|  Vulnerable
| align="center" | 
| 
| 
|-
! style="background:rgb(110,110,170)" | Groundshark
| 
| Sphyrna lewini| Scalloped hammerhead
| align=center |decreasing
|  Critically endangered 
| align="center" | 
| align="center" | 
| align="center" | II (eff. Sept. 2014)
|-
! style="background:rgb(110,110,170)" | Groundshark
| 
| Sphyrna mokarran| Great hammerhead
| align=center |decreasing
|  Critically Endangered
| align="center" | 
| 
| align="center" | II (eff. Sept. 2014)
|-
! style="background:rgb(110,110,170)" | Groundshark
| 
| Sphyrna tiburo| Bonnethead shark
| align=center |decreasing
|  Endangered
| align="center" | 
|-
! style="background:rgb(110,110,170)" | Groundshark
| 
| Sphyrna tudes| Smalleye hammerhead
| align=center |decreasing
|  Vulnerable
| align="center" | 
| 
| 
|-
! style="background:rgb(110,110,170)" | Groundshark
| 
| Sphyrna zygaena| Smooth hammerhead
| align=center |decreasing
|  Vulnerable
| align="center" | 
| 
| align="center" | II (eff. Sept. 2014)
|-
! style="background:rgb(110,110,170)" | Dogfish
| 
| Squalus acanthias| Piked dogfish
| align=center |decreasing
|  Vulnerable
| align="center" | 
| align="center" | 
| 
|-
! style="background:rgb(110,110,170)" | Dogfish
| 
| Squalus montalbani| Philippines spurdog
| align=center |decreasing
|  Vulnerable
| align="center" | 
| 
| 
|-
! style="background:rgb(110,110,170)" | Angel shark
| 
| Squatina aculeata| Sawback angelshark
| align=center |decreasing
|  Critically endangered
| align="center" | 
| align="center" | 
| 
|-
! style="background:rgb(110,110,170)" | Angel shark
| 
| Squatina albipunctata| Eastern angel shark
| align=center |decreasing
|  Vulnerable
| align="center" | 
| 
| 
|-
! style="background:rgb(110,110,170)" | Angel shark
| 
| Squatina argentina| Argentine angel shark
| align=center |decreasing
|  Endangered
| align="center" | 
| align="center" | 
| 
|-
! style="background:rgb(110,110,170)" | Angel shark
| 
| Squatina formosa| Taiwan angelshark
| align=center |unknown
|  Endangered
| align="center" | 
| align="center" | 
| 
|-
! style="background:rgb(110,110,170)" | Angel shark
| 
| Squatina guggenheim| Hidden angelshark
| align=center |decreasing
|  Endangered
| align="center" | 
| 
| 
|-
! style="background:rgb(110,110,170)" | Angel shark
| 
| Squatina japonica| Japanese angelshark
| align=center |unknown
|  Vulnerable
| align="center" | 
| align="center" | 
| 
|-
! style="background:rgb(110,110,170)" | Angel shark
| 
| Squatina nebulosa| Clouded angelshark
| align=center |unknown
|  Vulnerable
| align="center" | 
| align="center" | 
| 
|-
! style="background:rgb(110,110,170)" | Angel shark
| 
| Squatina oculata| Smoothback angel shark
| align=center |decreasing
|  Critically endangered
| align="center" | 
| align="center" | 
| 
|-
! style="background:rgb(110,110,170)" | Angel shark
| 
| Squatina punctata| Angular angelshark
| align=center |decreasing
|  Endangered
| align="center" | 
| 
| 
|-
! style="background:rgb(110,110,170)" | Angel shark
| 
| Squatina squatina| Angel shark
| align=center |decreasing
|  Critically endangered
| align="center" | 
| align="center" | 
| 
|-
! style="background:rgb(110,110,170)" | Angel shark
| 
| Squatina tergocellatoides| Ocellated angelshark
| align=center |unknown
|  Vulnerable
| align="center" | 
| align="center" | 
| 
|-
! style="background:rgb(110,110,170)" | Carpet shark
| 
| Stegostoma fasciatum| Zebra shark
| align=center |decreasing
|  Vulnerable
| align="center" | 
| align="center" | 
| 
|-
! style="background:rgb(110,110,170)" | Groundshark
| 
| Triakis acutipinna| Sharpfin houndshark
| align=center |decreasing
|  Endangered
| align="center" | 
| 
| 
|-
! style="background:rgb(110,110,170)" | Groundshark
| 
| Triakis maculata| Spotted houndshark
| align=center |decreasing
|  Vulnerable
| align="center" | 
| 
| 
|}

See also
 List of threatened rays

References

Further reading
 FAO (2000) Conservation and Management of Sharks Technical Guidelines for Responsible Fisheries, Rome. .
 Fowler SL, Cavanagh RD, Camhi M, Burgess GH, Cailliet GM, Fordham SV, Simpfendorfer CA and Musick JA (comp. and ed.) (2005) Sharks, Rays and Chimaeras: The Status of the Chondrichthyan Fishes IUCN Shark Specialist Group, Status Survey. .
 Musick, John A and Bonfil, Ramón (2005) Management techniques for elasmobranch fisheries Fisheries Technical Paper 474, FAO, Rome.
 Teutscher, Frans (2004) "Sharks (Chondrichthyes)" In: World markets and industry of selected commercially-exploited aquatic species with an international conservation profile, Camillo Catarci. Fisheries Circular 990, FAO
 Vannuccini, Stefania (2002) Shark Utilization, Marketing and Trade Fisheries Technical paper 389, FAO, Rome. .
 Endangered and Threatened Species Under NMFS’ Jurisdiction National Marine Fisheries Service'', NOAA. Updated: 28 February 28, 2013.

Lists of endangered animals
Endangered fish
Lists of fishes
Threatened
Lists of threatened species